Ernest Albert Vivian "Foffie" Williams (10 April 1914, Bank Hall, St Michael, Barbados – 13 April 1997, Bridgetown, Barbados) was a West Indian cricketer who played in four Tests in 1939 and 1948.

In the second innings of the First Test at Bridgetown in 1948, Williams hit his first six balls to the boundary: 6, 6, 4, 4, 4, 4. He reached 50 in half an hour and finished with 72 in 63 minutes. His highest first-class score was 131 not out for Barbados against Trinidad in 1935–36, when he and Manny Martindale shared an eighth-wicket partnership of 255, which remains a West Indian first-class record; he also took three wickets in each innings, opening the bowling.

He became the chief sports officer in Barbados.

References

External links
 
 

1914 births
1997 deaths
West Indies Test cricketers
Barbadian cricketers
Barbados cricketers